Cymbalism is an album recorded by American drummer Roy Haynes in 1963 for the New Jazz label.

Reception

AllMusic awarded the album 3 stars and its review by Alex Henderson states "it's a pleasing, well-rounded effort that deserves credit for diversity".

Track listing
 "Modette" (Frank Strozier) – 9:47   
 "I'm Getting Sentimental Over You" (George Bassman, Ned Washington) – 5:36   
 "Go 'n' Git It!" (Ronnie Mathews) – 3:52
 "La Palomeinding" (Strozier) – 6:40   
 "Medley: Hag/Cymbalism/Oleo" (Strozier/Roy Haynes, Richard Wyands/Sonny Rollins) – 11:05

Personnel 
Roy Haynes – drums
Frank Strozier – alto saxophone, flute
Ronnie Mathews – piano
Larry Ridley – bass

References 

1963 albums
Roy Haynes albums
New Jazz Records albums
Albums produced by Ozzie Cadena
Albums recorded at Van Gelder Studio